This is a list of all the genera in the botanical family Arecaceae, the palm family, based on Baker & Dransfield (2016), which is a revised listing of genera given in the 2008 edition of Genera Palmarum.

Taxonomy
This is a list of all the genera in the botanical family Arecaceae, the palm family, arranged by tribes and subtribes within the family.

Genera Palmarum (2008) lists 183 genera. Lanonia, Saribus, and the monotypic genera Jailoloa, Wallaceodoxa, Manjekia, and Sabinaria, which were described after 2008, have also been included below. Ceratolobus, Daemonorops, Pogonotium, Wallichia, Lytocaryum, and the monotypic genera Retispatha, Pritchardiopsis, and Solfia have since been removed from Genera Palmarum (2008) as obsolete genera. This brings the total number of genera to 181 as of 2016.

Subfamily Calamoideae
Tribe Eugeissoneae
Eugeissona – Borneo, Malay Peninsula
Tribe Lepidocaryeae – Africa and South America
Subtribe Ancistrophyllinae – Africa
Oncocalamus – Central Africa
Eremospatha – Africa
Laccosperma – Africa
Subtribe Raphiinae
Raphia – Africa, Madagascar, parts of South America
Subtribe Mauritiinae – northern South America
Lepidocaryum – central Amazon basin; monotypic genus
Mauritia – northern South America
Mauritiella – northern South America
Tribe Calameae – Africa and Asia
Subtribe Korthalsiinae
Korthalsia – Malesia, New Guinea, Indochina
Subtribe Salaccinae – Malesia, Indochina
Eleiodoxa – Malay Peninsula, Sumatra, Borneo; monotypic genus
Salacca – Malesia, Indochina
Subtribe Metroxylinae
Metroxylon – New Guinea, Melanesia
Subtribe Pigafettinae
Pigafetta – Sulawesi, Moluccas and New Guinea
Subtribe Plectocomiinae – Malesia, Indochina
Plectocomia – Malesia, Indochina
Myrialepis – Malesia, Malay Peninsula, Sumatra; monotypic genus
Plectocomiopsis – Malesia, Indochina
Subtribe Calaminae – Africa, Asia
Calamus – Africa, Asia

Obselete genera:
Retispatha – Borneo
Daemonorops – Malesia, Indochina
Ceratolobus – Malay Peninsula, Sumatra, Borneo
Pogonotium – northern Borneo

Subfamily Nypoideae
Nypa

Subfamily Coryphoideae
Tribe Sabaleae
Sabal – Caribbean, Gulf of Mexico, Mexico
Tribe Cryosophileae – Americas
Schippia – Guatemala and Belize; monotypic genus
Trithrinax – south-central South America
Zombia – Hispaniola; monotypic genus
Coccothrinax – Caribbean
Hemithrinax – Cuba
Leucothrinax – northern Caribbean; monotypic genus
Thrinax – Caribbean and Central America
Chelyocarpus – Peru and nearby
Cryosophila – Central America
Itaya – Amazon basin; monotypic genus
Sabinaria – Colombia and Panama; monotypic genus
Tribe Phoeniceae
Phoenix – Africa and Asia
Tribe Trachycarpeae
Subtribe Rhapidinae
Chamaerops – Mediterranean; monotypic genus
Guihaia – Vietnam and China
Trachycarpus – southern China, northern Indochina, Himalayas
Rhapidophyllum – Florida; monotypic genus
Maxburretia – Malay Peninsula
Rhapis – Indochina, Aceh
Subtribe Livistoninae
Livistona – Indomalaya, Australasia, Gulf of Aden
Licuala – Indochina, Malesia, Melanesia
Johannesteijsmannia – Malay Peninsula and nearby parts of Sumatra and Borneo
Pholidocarpus – Malaysia, northern Indonesia
Saribus – Malesia, New Guinea, Island Melanesia
Lanonia – southern China, Indochina, Java
Unplaced members of Trachycarpeae
Acoelorrhaphe – Central America, Cuba, Bahamas, Florida; monotypic genus
Serenoa – Florida, US Gulf Coast except Texas; monotypic genus
Brahea – Mexico, Central America
Colpothrinax – Central America, Cuba
Copernicia – Greater Antilles, South America
Pritchardia – Polynesia
Washingtonia – Baja California, Colorado River region
Tribe Chuniophoeniceae
Chuniophoenix – Vietnam, southern China
Kerriodoxa – southern Thailand; monotypic genus
Nannorrhops – SE Arabia, SE Iran, SW Pakistan; monotypic genus
Tahina – NW Madagascar; monotypic genus
Tribe Caryoteae – Indomalaya, Australasia
Caryota – Indomalaya, Australasia
Arenga – Indomalaya, Australasia
Tribe Corypheae
Corypha – Indomalaya, Australasia
Tribe Borasseae – Africa and Asia
Subtribe Hyphaenieae – Africa, Indian Ocean
Bismarckia – W Madagascar; monotypic genus
Satranala – NE Madagascar; monotypic genus
Hyphaene – Africa, Indian Ocean
Medemia – Upper Nile (Sudan, Egypt); monotypic genus
Subtribe Lataniieae – Africa and Asia
Latania – Mascarenes
Lodoicea – Seychelles; monotypic genus
Borassodendron – Malay Peninsula, Borneo
Borassus – Africa and Asia

Obsolete genera:
Pritchardiopsis – New Caledonia
Wallichia – Indochina, Himalayas

Subfamily Ceroxyloideae
Tribe Cyclospatheae
Pseudophoenix – Greater Antilles and nearby
Tribe Ceroxyleae
Ceroxylon – northern Andes
Juania – Juan Fernández Islands; monotypic genus
Oraniopsis – Queensland; monotypic genus
Ravenea – Madagascar and Comoros
Tribe Phytelepheae – NW South America, Panama, Costa Rica
Ammandra – Colombia, Ecuador; monotypic genus
Aphandra – western Amazon basin; monotypic genus
Phytelephas – NW South America, Panama, Costa Rica

Subfamily Arecoideae
Tribe Iriarteeae – northern South America
Iriartella – northern South America
Dictyocaryum – northern Andes, parts of Amazons
Iriartea – NW South America, Central America; monotypic genus
Socratea – northern South America, Central America
Wettinia – NW South America
Tribe Chamaedoreeae – Americas, Mascarenes
Hyophorbe – Mascarenes
Wendlandiella – Peruvian Amazon
Synechanthus – Central America, Colombia, Ecuador
Chamaedorea – Central America, NW South America
Gaussia – Mexico, Belize, Cuba
Tribe Podococceae
Podococcus – Nigeria, Cameroon, Equatorial Guinea
Tribe Oranieae
Orania – Malesia, New Guinea, Madagascar
Tribe Sclerospermeae
Sclerosperma – Central Africa
Tribe Roystoneeae
Roystonea – Caribbean
Tribe Reinhardtieae
Reinhardtia – Central America
Tribe Cocoseae
Subtribe Attaleinae
Beccariophoenix – Madagascar
Jubaeopsis – South Africa; monotypic genus
Voanioala – NE Madagascar; monotypic genus; monotypic genus
Allagoptera – Central South America
Attalea – Americas
Butia – SE South America
Cocos – cosmopolitan; monotypic genus
Jubaea – Chile; monotypic genus
Syagrus – South America
Parajubaea – Andes
Subtribe Bactridinae – Americas
Acrocomia – Americas
Astrocaryum – Americas
Aiphanes – NW South America, Caribbean
Bactris – South America, Central America, Caribbean
Desmoncus – South America, Central America
Subtribe Elaeidinae
Barcella – northern Brazil; monotypic genus
Elaeis – Africa, northern South America
Tribe Manicarieae
Manicaria – northern South America
Tribe Euterpeae – South America, Central America, Caribbean
Hyospathe – northern South America
Euterpe – South America, Central America
Prestoea – northern South America, Caribbean
Neonicholsonia – Central America; monotypic genus
Oenocarpus – South America
Tribe Geonomateae – Americas
Welfia – Central America, Colombia, Ecuador
Pholidostachys – NW South America, Panama, Costa Rica
Calyptrogyne – Central America
Calyptronoma – Greater Antilles
Asterogyne – northern South America, Central America
Geonoma – Americas
Tribe Leopoldinieae
Leopoldinia – Central Amazon basin
Tribe Pelagodoxeae – New Guinea, Oceania
Pelagodoxa – Marquesas Islands; monotypic genus
Sommieria – NW New Guinea; monotypic genus
Tribe Areceae – Malesia, Australasia, Madagascar
Subtribe Archontophoenicinae – New Guinea, Australia, New Caledonia
Actinorhytis – New Guinea; monotypic genus
Archontophoenix – eastern Australia
Actinokentia – New Caledonia
Chambeyronia – New Caledonia
Kentiopsis – New Caledonia
Subtribe Arecinae – Indochina, Malesia, New Guinea
Areca – Indochina, Malesia, New Guinea
Nenga – Malay Peninsula, Sumatra, Borneo, Java
Pinanga – Indochina, Malesia, New Guinea
Subtribe Basseliniinae – Island Melanesia
Basselinia – New Caledonia
Burretiokentia – New Caledonia
Cyphophoenix – New Caledonia
Cyphosperma – New Caledonia, Vanuatu, Fiji
Lepidorrhachis – Lord Howe Island; monotypic genus
Physokentia – Island Melanesia
Subtribe Carpoxylinae – Island Melanesia, Ryukyu Islands
Carpoxylon – northern Vanuatu; monotypic genus
Satakentia – Ryukyu Islands; monotypic genus
Neoveitchia – Vanuatu, Fiji
Subtribe Clinospermatinae – New Caledonia
Cyphokentia – New Caledonia
Clinosperma – New Caledonia
Subtribe Dypsidinae – Madagascar, Comoros
Dypsis – Madagascar, Comoros
Lemurophoenix – NE Madagascar; monotypic genus
Marojejya – E Madagascar
Masoala – E Madagascar
Subtribe Laccospadicinae – New Guinea, E Australia
Calyptrocalyx – New Guinea
Linospadix – New Guinea, E Australia
Howea – Lord Howe Island
Laccospadix – northern Queensland; monotypic genus
Subtribe Oncospermatinae – Malesia, Sri Lanka, Seychelles, Mascarenes
Oncosperma – Malesia
Deckenia – Seychelles; monotypic genus
Acanthophoenix – Mascarenes
Tectiphiala – Mauritius; monotypic genus
Subtribe Ptychospermatinae – Australasia
Ptychosperma – New Guinea, northern Australia
Ponapea – Caroline Islands, Bismarcks
Adonidia – Palawan
Balaka – Fiji, Samoa
Veitchia – Vanuatu, Fiji
Carpentaria – Northern Territory; monotypic genus
Wodyetia – northern Queensland; monotypic genus
Drymophloeus – NW New Guinea, Bismarcks, Solomon Islands, Samoa
Normanbya – northern Queensland; monotypic genus
Brassiophoenix – Papua New Guinea
Ptychococcus – New Guinea
Jailoloa – Halmahera; monotypic genus
Manjekia – Biak; monotypic genus
Wallaceodoxa – Raja Ampat Islands; monotypic genus
Subtribe Rhopalostylidinae – New Zealand
Rhopalostylis – New Zealand, Chatham Islands, Norfolk Island, and Kermadec Islands
Hedyscepe – Lord Howe Island; monotypic genus
Subtribe Verschaffeltiinae – Seychelles
Nephrosperma – Seychelles; monotypic genus
Phoenicophorium – Seychelles; monotypic genus
Roscheria – Seychelles; monotypic genus
Verschaffeltia – Seychelles; monotypic genus
Unplaced members of Areceae
Bentinckia – South India, Nicobars
Clinostigma – western Oceania
Cyrtostachys – Malesia, New Guinea, Solomon Islands
Dictyosperma – Mascarenes; monotypic genus
Dransfieldia – West Papua; monotypic genus
Heterospathe – Philippines, New Guinea, Island Melanesia
Hydriastele – Australasia
Iguanura – Malay Peninsula, Sumatra, Borneo
Loxococcus – Sri Lanka; monotypic genus
Rhopaloblaste – New Guinea, Solomon Islands, Malay Peninsula, Nicobar Islands

Obsolete genera:
Lytocaryum – Brazil
Solfia – Samoa

Geographical distributions
Below are geographical distributions of all the genera in the botanical family Arecaceae, following the 2008 edition of Genera Palmarum (pp. 647-650).

Islands and archipelagos with large numbers of endemic genera include New Caledonia, Lord Howe Island, New Guinea, Sri Lanka, Madagascar, Seychelles, and the Mascarenes.

Old World

Arabia
Hyphaene
Livistona
Nannorrhops
Phoenix

Australia (see also Lord Howe Island)
Archontophoenix
Arenga
Calamus
Carpentaria
Caryota
Cocos
Corypha
Hydriastele
Laccospadix
Licuala
Linospadix
Livistona
Normanbya
Nypa
Oraniopsis
Ptychosperma
Wodyetia

Borneo
Adonidia
Areca
Arenga
Borassodendron
Calamus
Caryota
Ceratolobus
Corypha
Cyrtostachys
Daemonorops
Eleiodoxa
Eugeissona
Iguanura
Johannesteijsmannia
Korthalsia
Licuala
Livistona
Nenga
Nypa
Oncosperma
Orania
Pholidocarpus
Pinanga
Plectocomia
Plectocomiopsis
Pogonotium
Retispatha
Salacca

China
Arenga
Borassus
Calamus
Caryota
Chuniophoenix
Corypha
Daemonorops
Guihaia
Lanonia
Licuala
Livistona
Nypa
Phoenix
Pinanga
Plectocomia
Rhapis
Salacca
Trachycarpus
Wallichia

Europe, North Africa, Egypt, Asia Minor
Chamaerops
Hyphaene
Medemia
Phoenix

Fiji and Samoa
Balaka
Calamus
Clinostigma
Cyphosperma
Drymophloeus
Heterospathe
Metroxylon
Neoveitchia
Physokentia
Pritchardia
Solfia
Veitchia

Hawaii
Pritchardia

India, including Andamans and Nicobars
Areca
Arenga
Bentinckia
Borassus
Calamus
Caryota
Corypha
Daemonorops
Hyphaene
Korthalsia
Licuala
Livistona
Nannorrhops
Nypa
Phoenix
Pinanga
Plectocomia
Rhopaloblaste
Trachycarpus
Wallichia

Indochina
Areca
Arenga
Borassus
Calamus
Caryota
Corypha
Chuniophoenix
Daemonorops
Guihaia
Korthalsia
Licuala
Livistona
Myrialepis
Nenga
Nypa
Oncosperma
Phoenix
Pinanga
Plectocomia
Plectocomiopsis
Rhapis
Salacca
Trachycarpus
Wallichia

Iran, Afghanistan, Pakistan
Hyphaene
Nannorrhops
Phoenix

Java
Areca
Arenga
Borassus
Calamus
Caryota
Ceratolobus
Corypha
Daemonorops
Korthalsia
Lanonia
Licuala
Livistona
Nenga
Nypa
Oncosperma
Orania
Pinanga
Plectocomia
Salacca

Lesser Sunda Islands
Borassus
Calamus
Caryota
Corypha
Daemonorops
Licuala
Nypa

Lord Howe Island
Hedyscepe
Howea
Lepidorrhachis

Madagascar and Comoros
Beccariophoenix
Bismarckia
Borassus
Dypsis
Elaeis
Hyphaene
Lemurophoenix
Marojejya
Masoala
Orania
Phoenix
Raphia
Ravenea
Satranala
Tahina
Voanioala

Malay Peninsula
Areca
Arenga
Borassodendron
Calamus
Caryota
Ceratolobus
Corypha
Cyrtostachys
Daemonorops
Eleiodoxa
Eugeissona
Iguanura
Johannesteijsmannia
Korthalsia
Licuala
Livistona
Maxburretia
Myrialepis
Nenga
Nypa
Oncosperma
Orania
Phoenix
Pholidocarpus
Pinanga
Plectocomia
Plectocomiopsis
Pogonotium
Rhopaloblaste
Salacca

Marquesas
Pelagodoxa

Mascarenes
Acanthophoenix
Dictyosperma
Hyophorbe
Latania
Tectiphiala

Micronesia
Clinostigma
Heterospathe
Hydriastele
Livistona
Metroxylon
Nypa
Pinanga
Ponapea

Moluccas
Areca
Arenga
Borassus
Calamus
Calyptrocalyx
Caryota
Corypha
Daemonorops
Drymophloeus
Heterospathe
Hydriastele
Jailoloa
Licuala
Livistona
Metroxylon
Nypa
Oncosperma
Orania
Pholidocarpus
Pigafetta
Pinanga
Ptychosperma
Rhopaloblaste
Wallaceodoxa

Myanmar
Areca
Arenga
Borassus
Calamus
Caryota
Corypha
Daemonorops
Korthalsia
Licuala
Livistona
Myrialepis
Nypa
Oncosperma
Phoenix
Pinanga
Plectocomia
Salacca
Trachycarpus
Wallichia

New Caledonia
Actinokentia
Basselinia
Burretiokentia
Chambeyronia
Clinosperma
Cyphokentia
Cyphophoenix
Cyphosperma
Kentiopsis
Pritchardiopsis

New Guinea and the Bismarck Archipelago
Actinorhytis
Areca
Arenga
Borassus
Brassiophoenix
Calamus
Calyptrocalyx
Caryota
Clinostigma
Corypha
Cyrtostachys
Daemonorops
Dransfieldia
Drymophloeus
Heterospathe
Hydriastele
Korthalsia
Licuala
Linospadix
Livistona
Metroxylon
Nypa
Orania
Physokentia
Pigafetta
Pinanga
Ptychococcus
Ptychosperma
Rhopaloblaste
Sommieria

New Hebrides
Calamus
Carpoxylon
Caryota
Clinostigma
Cyphosperma
Heterospathe
Hydriastele
Licuala
Metroxylon
Neoveitchia
Physokentia
Veitchia

New Zealand
Rhopalostylis

Philippines
Adonidia
Areca
Arenga
Livistona
Calamus
Caryota
Cocos
Corypha
Daemonorops
Heterospathe
Korthalsia
Licuala
Nypa
Oncosperma
Orania
Phoenix
Pinanga
Plectocomia
Salacca

Ryukyu Islands
Arenga
Livistona
Nypa
Phoenix
Satakentia

Seychelles
Deckenia
Lodoicea
Nephrosperma
Phoenicophorium
Roscheria
Verschaffeltia

Solomon Islands
Actinorhytis
Areca
Calamus
Caryota
Clinostigma
Cyrtostachys
Drymophloeus
Heterospathe
Hydriastele
Licuala
Livistona
Metroxylon
Nypa
Physokentia
Ptychosperma
Rhopaloblaste

Sri Lanka (Ceylon)
Areca
Borassus
Calamus
Caryota
Corypha
Loxococcus
Oncosperma
Phoenix

Sulawesi
Areca
Arenga
Borassus
Calamus
Caryota
Corypha
Daemonorops
Hydriastele
Korthalsia
Licuala
Livistona
Nypa
Oncosperma
Orania
Pholidocarpus
Pigafetta
Pinanga

Sumatra
Areca
Arenga
Calamus
Caryota
Ceratolobus
Corypha
Cyrtostachys
Daemonorops
Eleiodoxa
Iguanura
Johannesteijsmannia
Korthalsia
Licuala
Livistona
Myrialepis
Nenga
Nypa
Oncosperma
Orania
Phoenix
Pholidocarpus
Pinanga
Plectocomia
Plectocomiopsis
Rhapis
Salacca

Thailand
Areca
Arenga
Borassodendron
Borassus
Calamus
Caryota
Ceratolobus
Corypha
Cyrtostachys
Daemonorops
Eleiodoxa
Eugeissona
Iguanura
Johannesteijsmannia
Kerriodoxa
Korthalsia
Licuala
Livistona
Maxburretia
Myrialepis
Nenga
Nypa
Oncosperma
Orania
Phoenix
Pinanga
Plectocomia
Plectocomiopsis
Rhapis
Salacca
Trachycarpus
Wallichia

Africa
Sub-Saharan Africa (i.e., Africa, but excluding North Africa) has 16 genera and 65 species.

Tropical West Africa
Borassus
Elaeis
Eremospatha
Hyphaene
Laccosperma
Oncocalamus
Phoenix
Podococcus
Raphia
Sclerosperma

Tropical East Africa
Borassus
Elaeis
Eremospatha
Hyphaene
Laccosperma
Livistona
Medemia
Phoenix
Raphia

Southern Africa
Borassus
Hyphaene
Jubaeopsis
Phoenix
Raphia

New World

There are 65 genera and 730 species in the New World.

Argentina
Acrocomia
Allagoptera
Butia
Copernicia
Euterpe
Syagrus
Trithrinax

Bolivia
Acrocomia
Aiphanes
Astrocaryum
Attalea
Bactris
Ceroxylon
Chamaedorea
Chelyocarpus
Copernicia
Desmoncus
Dictyocaryum
Euterpe
Geonoma
Hyospathe
Iriartea
Iriartella
Mauritia
Mauritiella
Oenocarpus
Parajubaea
Phytelephas
Prestoea
Socratea
Syagrus
Trithrinax
Wendlandiella
Wettinia

Brazil
Acrocomia
Aiphanes
Aphandra
Attalea
Allagoptera
Astrocaryum
Bactris
Barcella
Butia
Chamaedorea
Chelyocarpus
Copernicia
Desmoncus
Dictyocaryum
Elaeis
Euterpe
Geonoma
Hyospathe
Iriartea
Iriartella
Itaya
Leopoldinia
Lepidocaryum
Lytocaryum
Manicaria
Mauritia
Mauritiella
Oenocarpus
Pholidostachys
Phytelephas
Prestoea
Raphia
Socratea
Syagrus
Trithrinax
Wendlandiella
Wettinia

Central America
Acoelorrhaphe
Acrocomia
Aiphanes
Asterogyne
Astrocaryum
Attalea
Bactris
Brahea
Calyptrogyne
Chamaedorea
Colpothrinax
Cryosophila
Desmoncus
Elaeis
Euterpe
Gaussia
Geonoma
Hyospathe
Iriartea
Manicaria
Neonicholsonia
Oenocarpus
Pholidostachys
Phytelephas
Prestoea
Pseudophoenix
Raphia
Reinhardtia
Roystonea
Sabal
Schippia
Socratea
Synechanthus
Welfia

Chile (see also Juan Fernández Islands)
Jubaea

Colombia
Acrocomia
Aiphanes
Ammandra
Asterogyne
Astrocaryum
Attalea
Bactris
Calyptrogyne
Ceroxylon
Chamaedorea
Chelyocarpus
Copernicia
Cryosophila
Desmoncus
Dictyocaryum
Elaeis
Euterpe
Geonoma
Iriartea
Iriartella
Itaya
Hyospathe
Leopoldinia
Lepidocaryum
Manicaria
Mauritia
Mauritiella
Oenocarpus
Pholidostachys
Phytelephas
Prestoea
Raphia
Reinhardtia
Roystonea
Sabal
Sabinaria
Socratea
Syagrus
Synechanthus
Welfia
Wettinia

Ecuador
Aiphanes
Aphandra
Astrocaryum
Attalea
Bactris
Ceroxylon
Chamaedorea
Chelyocarpus
Desmoncus
Dictyocaryum
Elaeis
Euterpe
Geonoma
Hyospathe
Iriartea
Manicaria
Mauritia
Mauritiella
Oenocarpus
Parajubaea
Pholidostachys
Phytelephas
Prestoea
Socratea
Syagrus
Synechanthus
Welfia
Wettinia

Greater Antilles (Cuba, Hispaniola, Jamaica, Puerto Rico)
Acoelorrhaphe
Acrocomia
Attalea
Bactris
Calyptronoma
Coccothrinax
Colpothrinax
Copernicia
Gaussia
Geonoma
Hemithrinax
Leucothrinax
Prestoea
Pseudophoenix
Roystonea
Sabal
Thrinax
Zombia

Guianas
Acrocomia
Astrocaryum
Attalea
Bactris
Desmoncus
Dictyocaryum
Elaeis
Euterpe
Geonoma
Hyospathe
Iriartella
Lepidocaryum
Manicaria
Mauritia
Mauritiella
Oenocarpus
Prestoea
Roystonea
Socratea
Syagrus

Juan Fernández Islands
Juania

Lesser Antilles
Acrocomia
Aiphanes
Coccothrinax
Desmoncus
Euterpe
Geonoma
Leucothrinax
Prestoea
Pseudophoenix
Roystonea
Sabal
Syagrus

Mexico
Acoelorrhaphe
Acrocomia
Astrocaryum
Attalea
Bactris
Brahea
Calyptrogyne
Chamaedorea
Coccothrinax
Cryosophila
Desmoncus
Gaussia
Geonoma
Pseudophoenix
Reinhardtia
Roystonea
Sabal
Synechanthus
Thrinax
Washingtonia

Paraguay
Acrocomia
Allagoptera
Attalea
Bactris
Butia
Copernicia
Geonoma
Syagrus
Trithrinax

Peru
Aiphanes
Aphandra
Astrocaryum
Attalea
Bactris
Ceroxylon
Chamaedorea
Chelyocarpus
Desmoncus
Dictyocaryum
Euterpe
Geonoma
Hyospathe
Iriartella
Iriartea
Itaya
Lepidocaryum
Mauritia
Mauritiella
Oenocarpus
Pholidostachys
Phytelephas
Prestoea
Socratea
Syagrus
Wendlandiella
Wettinia

Uruguay
Butia
Syagrus
Trithrinax

USA (continental)
Acoelorrhaphe
Coccothrinax
Leucothrinax
Pseudophoenix
Rhapidophyllum
Roystonea
Sabal
Serenoa
Thrinax
Washingtonia

Venezuela, Trinidad and Tobago
Acrocomia
Aiphanes
Asterogyne
Astrocaryum
Attalea
Bactris
Ceroxylon
Chamaedorea
Coccothrinax
Copernicia
Desmoncus
Dictyocaryum
Euterpe
Geonoma
Hyospathe
Iriartea
Iriartella
Leopoldinia
Lepidocaryum
Manicaria
Mauritia
Mauritiella
Oenocarpus
Prestoea
Roystonea
Sabal
Socratea
Syagrus
Wettinia

Extinct genera
Paschalococos
Latanites
Palaeoraphe
Palmoxylon
Phoenicites

See also
Climbing palm
Fan palm
List of hardy palms

References

External links
Classification on Palmweb

 
Arecaceae
Arecaceae